Leave Here a Stranger is the sixth full-length album by Starflyer 59. Unlike most contemporary albums, it was recorded and mixed in mono as opposed to stereo. Leave Here a Stranger was listed in Los Angeles Times among the Top 10 albums of 2001.

HM Magazine characterizes its lyrical content as a concept album about the troubles associated with the life of a recording artist.

Track listing
All songs written by Jason Martin.

Personnel
Starflyer 59
Jason Martin – vocals, guitar
Jeff Cloud – bass guitar
Josh Dooley – keyboards
Joey Esquibel – drums

Additional personnel
Terry Scott Taylor – producer
Andrew D. Prickett – engineer
Chris Colbert – mixing
Rob Watson – additionals
Frank Lenz – additionals
Brian Gardner – mastering

References

2001 albums
Starflyer 59 albums
Tooth & Nail Records albums